The 1992 United States Senate election in Utah was held on November 3, 1992. Incumbent Republican U.S. Senator Jake Garn decided to retire instead of seeking a fourth term. Republican Bob Bennett won the open seat.

Major candidates

Democratic
 Wayne Owens, U.S Representative

Republican
 Bob Bennett, CEO of FranklinCovey and son of former U.S. Senator Wallace F. Bennett
 Joseph A. Cannon
 Ted Stewart

Other candidates

Populist
Anita Morrow

Libertarian
Maury Modine

Socialist Workers
Patricia Grogan

Results

See also
 1992 United States Senate elections

References

1992
Utah
1992 Utah elections